Phú Thọ may refer to several places in Vietnam, including:

Phú Thọ Province
Phú Thọ, a district-level town of Phú Thọ Province
Phú Thọ, Bình Dương, a ward of Thủ Dầu Một
Phú Thọ, An Giang, a commune of Phú Tân District, An Giang Province
Phú Thọ, Quảng Nam, a commune of Quế Sơn District
Phú Thọ, Đồng Tháp, a commune of Tam Nông District, Đồng Tháp Province

See also
 Phú Thọ Hòa, a ward of Tân Phú District, Ho Chi Minh City